A lady is a term for a woman, the counterpart of "lord" or "gentleman".

Lady or Ladies may also refer to:

People
 First Lady, wife of a head of state
 Lady (American rapper) (Shameka Shanta Brown; born 1989)
 Lady Bardales (born 1982), Peruvian police officer
 Robert Seldon Lady (born 1954), CIA agent, involved in Abu Omar rendition/kidnaping
 Wendell Lady (1930-2022), American politician

Places

Poland
 Lady, Podlaskie Voivodeship
 Lądy, Pomeranian Voivodeship
 Łady, Pruszków County
 Łady, Sochaczew County

Songs
 "Lady" (You Bring Me Up), a 1981 song by the Commodores
 "Lady" (D'Angelo song), 1996
 "Lady" (EXID song)
 "Lady" (Jack Jones song), 1967
 "Lady" (Lenny Kravitz song), 2004
 "Lady" (Little River Band song), 1978
 "Lady" (Hear Me Tonight), a 2000 house song by Modjo
 "Lady" (Stevie Nicks song)
 "Lady" (Kenny Rogers song), written by Lionel Richie, 1980
 "Lady" (Styx song), 1974
 "Lady" (Brett Young song), 2020
 "Lady" (Dennis Wilson song), 1970
 "Lady", a song by England Dan & John Ford Coley from Nights Are Forever
 "Lady", a song by Brotherhood of Man from Good Things Happening
 "Lady", a song by Fela Kuti from Shakara
 "Lady", a song by Gino Vannelli from Powerful People
 "Lady", a song by Supertramp from Crisis? What Crisis?
 "Lady", a song by David Coverdale from White Snake
 "Lady", a song by Simply Red from Stay
 "Lady", a song by CNBLUE from What Turns You On?

 "Ladies" (song), a 2003 song by Sarai
 "Ladies", a song by Inna from the album Hot
 "Ladies", a 2009 song by Lee Fields

Other uses
 Lady (group), South Korean transgender pop group 
 Lady (sculpture), an outdoor sculpture by Jan Zach
 Lady!!, a Japanese shōjo manga
 Lady, a fictional character in Lady and the Tramp
 LADY, alternative name for an N battery
 Lady, a character in Thomas and the Magic Railroad and Calling All Engines
 Lady (Devil May Cry), a character in the Devil May Cry video game series
 "The Ladies", a euphemism for the women's bathroom
 Ladies, an Cambodian women's magazine
 Lady apple, a cultivar also referred to as just "Lady".

See also

 A Lady (disambiguation)
 
 
 
 
 Gentlewoman (disambiguation)
 Lady of the House (disambiguation)
 Milady (disambiguation), also M'Lady
 Our Lady (disambiguation)
 The Lady (disambiguation)